Chal Gerd-e Keshtvarzeh (also Romanized as Chāl Gerd-e Keshtvarzeh; also known as Chālgah-e Keshtvarzeh) is a village in Zaz-e Sharqi Rural District, Zaz va Mahru District, Aligudarz County, Lorestan Province, Iran. At the 2006 census, its population was 212, in 32 families.

References 

Towns and villages in Aligudarz County